Abja-Vanamõisa (also known as Tümpsi) is a village in Mulgi Parish, Viljandi County, in southern Estonia. Abja-Vanamõisa has a population of 95 (as of 1 January 2012).

The village was first mentioned in 1583 when the Livonian War was ending. It's known that a school operated in Vanamõisa already in 1838. In 1914 a flax factory which is considered to be the first in Estonia was established by engineer Mats Kissa (1887–1956) in Vanamõisa. The factory was closed in 1990.

Soviet admiral  (1895–1937) was born in Ärma farmstead in Abja-Vanamõisa.

Popular Estonian organic dairy products producer Pajumäe Farm is located in Abja-Vanaõisa.

References

External links
Official website 
Pajumäe farm 

Villages in Viljandi County
Kreis Pernau